Mario Pennacchia (10 May 1928 – 24 August 2021) was an Italian sports journalist who wrote for Corriere dello Sport, Il Corriere dello Sport, La Gazzetta dello Sport, Il Messaggerò, and Il Giorno.

References

1928 births
2021 deaths
Italian sports journalists
20th-century Italian journalists
21st-century Italian journalists
People from the Province of Latina